Lee Tae-hoon (born 7 June 1971) is a South Korean professional football manager.

Career
Since October 2010 until June 2012 he coached the Cambodia national football team. Since July 2013 he again is a head coach of Cambodia U-15 team.

References

External links

Profile at Soccerpunter.com

1971 births
Living people
South Korean football managers
South Korean expatriate football managers
Expatriate football managers in Cambodia
Expatriate football managers in Vietnam
Cambodia national football team managers
Place of birth missing (living people)
South Korean expatriates in Cambodia
South Korean expatriate sportspeople in Vietnam